Keith Goodwin (25 June 1938 – 19 August 2003) was an English cricketer active from 1960 to 1974 who played for Lancashire. He was born in Oldham and died in Portsmouth. He appeared in 124 first-class matches as a righthanded batsman and wicketkeeper. He scored 636 runs with a highest score of 23 and held 230 catches with 28 stumpings.

Notes

1938 births
2003 deaths
English cricketers
Lancashire cricketers